Caln Meeting House is a historic Quaker meeting house located at 901 Caln Meeting House Road, near Coatesville in Caln Township, Chester County, Pennsylvania.  It was built in 1726, and is a one-story, tan fieldstone structure.  It was enlarged to its present size in 1801.

It was added to the National Register of Historic Places in 1984. Services are still held weekly at the meeting house. A graveyard is also held on the northern end of the building, with another sitting on the other side of PA 340. 

One third of the Caln Meeting House is used by the Old Caln Historical Society as a local history museum and to house archives, artifacts and other historical memorabilia.

References

Further reading

External links

 Caln Friends Meeting House, Northeast corner of Kings Highway (Route 340) & Meetinghouse Road, Thorndale, Chester County, PA: 26 photos, 3 color transparencies, 3 measured drawings, 24 data pages, and 2 photo caption pages at Historic American Buildings Survey

Cemeteries in Chester County, Pennsylvania
Quaker meeting houses in Pennsylvania
Churches on the National Register of Historic Places in Pennsylvania
Churches completed in 1726
18th-century Quaker meeting houses
Churches in Chester County, Pennsylvania
Museums in Chester County, Pennsylvania
History museums in Pennsylvania
1726 establishments in Pennsylvania
National Register of Historic Places in Chester County, Pennsylvania